The 2005 Pennsylvania 500 was the 20th stock car racing race of the 2005 NASCAR Nextel Cup Series season and the 32nd iteration of the event. The race was held on Sunday, July 24, 2005, before a crowd of 100,000 in Long Pond, Pennsylvania, at Pocono Raceway, a 2.5 miles (4.0 km) triangular permanent course. The race was extended from 200 laps to 203 due to a green–white–checker finish caused by Michael Waltrip spinning with two to go. The race would end under caution, with Kurt Busch of Roush Racing pulling ahead of Rusty Wallace of Penske Racing when the caution came out due to Kasey Kahne hitting the wall on the final lap. The race would be Busch's 13th NASCAR Nextel Cup Series win of his career and his second of the season. To fill out the podium, Mark Martin of Roush Racing would finish third.

Background 

The race was held at Pocono Raceway, which is a three-turn superspeedway located in Long Pond, Pennsylvania. The track hosts two annual NASCAR Sprint Cup Series races, as well as one Xfinity Series and Camping World Truck Series event. Until 2019, the track also hosted an IndyCar Series race.

Pocono Raceway is one of a very few NASCAR tracks not owned by either Speedway Motorsports, Inc. or International Speedway Corporation. It is operated by the Igdalsky siblings Brandon, Nicholas, and sister Ashley, and cousins Joseph IV and Chase Mattioli, all of whom are third-generation members of the family-owned Mattco Inc, started by Joseph II and Rose Mattioli.

Outside of the NASCAR races, the track is used throughout the year by Sports Car Club of America (SCCA) and motorcycle clubs as well as racing schools and an IndyCar race. The triangular oval also has three separate infield sections of racetrack – North Course, East Course and South Course. Each of these infield sections use a separate portion of the tri-oval to complete the track. During regular non-race weekends, multiple clubs can use the track by running on different infield sections. Also some of the infield sections can be run in either direction, or multiple infield sections can be put together – such as running the North Course and the South Course and using the tri-oval to connect the two.

Entry list

Practice

First practice 
The first practice session would occur on Friday, July 22, at 1:20 PM EST, and would last for one hour and 20 minutes.

Second and final practice 
The second and final practice session would occur on Friday, July 22, at 4:00 PM EST, and would last for one hour and 15 minutes.

Qualifying 
Qualifying would take place on Saturday, July 23, at 12:10 PM EST. Each driver would have two laps to set a fastest time; the fastest of the two would count as their official qualifying lap.

Two incidents would occur in qualifying: first, Derrike Cope would hit the wall in Turn 2, then in Turn 3 during his first lap, causing Cope to not set a lap time. Then, Carl Long would spin in Turn 1 and hit the wall during his first lap, causing him to also not set a lap time.

Four drivers would fail to qualify: Morgan Shepherd, Hermie Sadler, Carl Long, and Derrike Cope.

Full qualifying results 

*Gerhart would qualify for Carl Edwards, as Edwards would later race in the day's NASCAR Busch Grand National Series race.

Race results

References 

2005 NASCAR Nextel Cup Series
NASCAR races at Pocono Raceway
July 2005 sports events in the United States
2005 in sports in Pennsylvania